was the isolationist foreign policy of the Japanese Tokugawa shogunate under which, for a period of 265 years during the Edo period (from 1603 to 1868), relations and trade between Japan and other countries were severely limited, and nearly all foreign nationals were banned from entering Japan, while common Japanese people were kept from leaving the country. 

The policy was enacted by the shogunate government (or ) under Tokugawa Iemitsu through a number of edicts and policies from 1633 to 1639, and ended after 1853 when the Perry Expedition commanded by Matthew C. Perry forced the opening of Japan to American (and, by extension, Western) trade through a series of treaties, called the Convention of Kanagawa.

It was preceded by a period of largely unrestricted trade and widespread piracy. Japanese mariners and merchants traveled Asia, sometimes forming  communities in certain cities, while official embassies and envoys visited Asian states, New Spain (known as Mexico since the early 19th century), and Europe. This period was also noted for a large number of foreign traders and pirates who were resident in Japan and active in Japanese waters.

The term  originates from the manuscript work  written by Japanese astronomer and translator Shizuki Tadao in 1801. Shizuki invented the word while translating the works of the 17th-century German traveller Engelbert Kaempfer concerning Japan.

Japan was not completely isolated under the  policy.  was a system in which strict regulations were placed on commerce and foreign relations by the shogunate and certain feudal domains. There was extensive trade with China through the port of Nagasaki, in the far west of Japan, with a residential area for the Chinese. The policy stated that the only European influence permitted was the Dutch factory at Dejima in Nagasaki. Western scientific, technical and medical innovations flowed into Japan through  ("Dutch learning"). Trade with Korea was limited to the Tsushima Domain (today part of Nagasaki Prefecture) and the wakan in Choryang (part of present-day Busan). There were also diplomatic exchanges done through the Joseon Tongsinsa from Korea. Trade with the Ainu people was limited to the Matsumae Domain in Hokkaidō, and trade with the Ryūkyū Kingdom took place in Satsuma Domain (present-day Kagoshima Prefecture).

China under the Ming and Qing dynasties as well as Joseon had implemented isolationist policies before Japan did, starting with the Ming implementing Haijin from 1371. Unlike sakoku, foreign influences outside East Asia were banned by the Chinese and Koreans as well, while Rangaku allowed Western ideas other than Christianity to be studied in Japan. China was forced to open up in the Treaty of Nanking and in subsequent treaties, following its defeat in the First Opium War. Joseon, which had developed a reputation as a hermit kingdom, was forced out of isolationism by Japan in the Japan–Korea Treaty of 1876, making use of gunboat diplomacy which had been used by the United States to force Japan to open up.

Trade under  

During the  period, Japan traded with five entities, through four "gateways". The largest was the private Chinese trade at Nagasaki (who also traded with the Ryūkyū Kingdom), where the Dutch East India Company was also permitted to operate. The Matsumae clan domain in Hokkaidō (then called Ezo) traded with the Ainu people. Through the Sō clan  of Tsushima, there were relations with Joseon-dynasty Korea. Ryūkyū, a semi-independent kingdom for nearly all of the Edo period, was controlled by the Shimazu clan  of Satsuma Domain.

Many items traded from Japan to Korea and the Ryūkyū Kingdom were eventually shipped to China. In the Ryūkyū Islands and Korea, the clans in charge of trade built trading towns outside Japanese territory where commerce actually took place. Due to the necessity for Japanese subjects to travel to and from these trading posts, this resembled something of an outgoing trade, with Japanese subjects making regular contact with foreign traders in essentially extraterritorial land.

Commerce with Chinese and Dutch traders in Nagasaki took place on an island called Dejima, separated from the city by a narrow strait; foreigners could not enter Nagasaki from Dejima, nor could Japanese civilians enter Dejima without special permission or authorization. For the island's inhabitants, conditions on Dejima were humiliating; the police of Nagasaki could harass them at will, and at all times a strong Japanese guard was stationed on the narrow bridge to the mainland in order to prevent them from leaving the island.

Terminology 
Trade prospered during the  period, and though relations and trade were restricted to certain ports, the country was far from closed. Even as the shogunate expelled the Portuguese, they simultaneously engaged in discussions with Dutch and Korean representatives to ensure that the overall volume of trade did not suffer. 

Rationale 

It is conventionally regarded that the shogunate imposed and enforced the  policy in order to remove the colonial and religious influence of primarily Spain and Portugal, which were perceived as posing a threat to the stability of the shogunate and to peace in the archipelago. The increasing number of Catholic converts in southern Japan (mainly Kyūshū) was a significant element of that which was seen as a threat. Based on work conducted by Japanese historians in the 1970s, some scholars have challenged this view, believing it to be only a partial explanation of political reality.

Before the Tokugawa, Toyotomi Hideyoshi had previously begun to turn against the European missionaries after the Spanish conquest of the Philippines began, and the gradual progress of the Spanish there led to increasing hostility from the Tokugawa as well.

The motivations for the gradual strengthening of the maritime prohibitions during the early 17th century should be considered within the context of the Tokugawa 's domestic agenda.

These  had used East Asian trading linkages to profitable effect during the Sengoku period, which allowed them to build up their military strength as well.

Directing trade predominantly through Nagasaki, which came under Toyotomi Hideyoshi's control in 1587, would enable the bakufu, through taxes and levies, to bolster its own treasury. This was no small matter, as lack of wealth had limited both the preceding Kamakura  and the Muromachi  in crucial ways. The focus on the removal of Western and Christian influence from the Japanese archipelago as the main driver of the  could be argued to be a somewhat eurocentric reading of Japanese history, although it is a common perception.

Nevertheless, Christianity and the two colonial powers it was most strongly associated with were seen as genuine threats by the Tokugawa . Once the remnants of the Toyotomi clan had been defeated in 1615, Tokugawa Hidetada turned his attention to the sole remaining credible challenge to Tokugawa supremacy. The Empress Meishō (r. 1629–43) also had grave doubts when she heard about how the Spanish and Portuguese were settling in the New World, and thought that Japan would soon become one of the many countries in their possession.

Protestant English and Dutch traders reinforced this perception by accusing the Spanish and Portuguese missionaries of spreading the religion systematically, as part of a claimed policy of culturally dominating and colonizing Asian countries. The Dutch and English were generally seen by the Japanese to be able to separate religion and trade, while their Iberian counterparts were looked upon with much suspicion. The Dutch, eager to take over trade from the Spanish and Portuguese, had no problems reinforcing this view. 

The number of Christians in Japan had been steadily rising due to the efforts of missionaries, such as Francis Xavier and  converts. In the aftermath, the shogunate accused missionaries of instigating the rebellion, expelled them from the country, and strictly banned the religion on penalty of death. The remaining Japanese Christians, mostly in Nagasaki, formed underground communities and came to be called .

All contact with the outside world became strictly regulated by the shogunate, or by the domains (Tsushima, Matsumae, and Satsuma) assigned to the task. Dutch traders were permitted to continue commerce in Japan only by agreeing not to engage in missionary activities. Today, the Christian percentage of the population (1%) in Japan remains far lower than in other East Asian countries such as China (3%), Vietnam (7%) and South Korea (29%).

The  policy was also a way of controlling commerce between Japan and other nations, as well as asserting its new place in the East Asian hierarchy. The Tokugawa had set out to create their own small-scale international system where Japan could continue to access the trade in essential commodities such as medicines, and gain access to essential intelligence about happenings in China while avoiding having to agree to a subordinate status within the Chinese tributary system.

Japan's generally constructive official diplomatic relationship with Joseon Korea allowed regular embassies (Tongsinsa) to be dispatched by Korea to Japan. Together with the brisk trade between Tsushima and Korea, as well as the presence of Japanese in the Busan wakan, Japan was able to access Chinese cultural, intellectual and technological developments throughout the Edo period. At the time of the promulgation of the strictest versions of the maritime prohibitions, the Ming dynasty had lost control of much of China and it was unnecessary, and perhaps undesirable, for Japan to pursue official diplomatic relations with either of the Ming or the Qing governments while the issue of imperial legitimacy was unsettled.

Japan was able to acquire the imported goods it required through intermediary trade with the Dutch and through the Ryukyu Islands. The Japanese actually encouraged the Ryūkyū Kingdom's rulers to maintain a tributary relationship with China, even though the Shimazu clan had surreptitiously established great political influence in the Ryukyu Islands. The Qing became much more open to trade after it had defeated the Ming loyalists in Taiwan, and thus Japan's rulers felt even less need to establish official relations with China.

Liberalizing challenges to  came from within Japan's elite in the 18th century, but they came to nothing. Later on, the  policy was the main safeguard against the total depletion of Japanese mineral resources—such as silver and copper—to the outside world. However, while silver exportation through Nagasaki was controlled by the shogunate to the point of stopping all exportation, the exportation of silver through Korea continued in relatively high quantities.

The way Japan kept abreast of Western technology during this period was by studying medical and other texts in the Dutch language obtained through Dejima. It became obsolete after the country was opened and the  policy collapsed. Thereafter, many Japanese students (e.g., Kikuchi Dairoku) were sent to study in foreign countries, and many foreign employees were employed in Japan (see ).

The policies associated with  ended with the Convention of Kanagawa in response to demands made by Commodore Perry.

Challenges to seclusion
Many isolated attempts to end Japan's seclusion were made by expanding Western powers during the 17th, 18th and 19th centuries. American, Russian and French ships all attempted to engage in a relationship with Japan but were rejected.

In 1640, the Portuguese out of Macau sent envoys to convince the shogunate to reverse their recent expulsion and cessation of trade. They were captured, their ship burnt, and 61 members of the mission were executed by order of the bakufu, on August 4.
In 1647 Portuguese warships attempted to enter Nagasaki. The Japanese formed a blockade of almost 900 boats to stop the ships. After the event, the Japanese added more security to Nagasaki as fears rose that other countries would challenge the new seclusion policy and attempt to enter through Nagasaki.
In 1738, a three-ship Russian naval squadron led by Martin Spanberg visited the island of Honshu. The Russians landed in a scenic area which is now part of the Rikuchu Kaigan National Park and reported civil treatment. Spanberg led two further voyages in Japanese waters in 1739 and 1742, helping advance Russian interests in the Kurils.
In 1778, a Russian merchant from Yakutsk by the name of Pavel Lebedev-Lastochkin arrived in Hokkaidō as part of a small expedition. He offered gifts, and politely asked to trade, but in vain.
In 1787, Jean-François de Galaup, comte de Lapérouse navigated in Japanese waters. He visited the Ryūkyū islands and the strait between Hokkaidō and Sakhalin, naming it after himself.
In 1791, two American ships commanded by the American explorer John Kendrick—the Lady Washington, under Captain Kendrick, and the Grace, under Captain William Douglas—stopped for 11 days on Kii Ōshima island, south of the Kii Peninsula. Kendrick was the first known American to have visited Japan. He apparently planted an American flag and claimed the islands, although only one English-language account of the voyage exists.
In 1792 the Russian subject Adam Laxman visited the island of Hokkaido.
From 1797 to 1809, several American ships traded in Nagasaki under the Dutch flag, upon the request of the Dutch who were not able to send their own ships because of their conflict against Britain during the Napoleonic Wars:
 In 1797 US Captain William Robert Stewart, commissioned by the Dutch from Batavia, took the ship Eliza of New York to Nagasaki, Japan, with a cargo of Dutch trade goods.
 In 1803, William Robert Stewart returned on board a ship named "The Emperor of Japan" (the captured and renamed "Eliza of New York"), entered Nagasaki harbor, and tried in vain to trade through the Dutch enclave of Dejima.
 Another American captain John Derby of Salem, Massachusetts aboard the Margaret, tried in vain to open Japan to the opium trade.
In 1804, the Russian expedition around the world led by captain Adam Johann von Krusenstern reached Nagasaki. The Russian envoy Nikolai Rezanov requested trade exchanges. The Bakufu refused the request and the ships had to leave in spring 1805. The Russians attacked Sakhalin and the Kuril islands during the following three years, prompting the Bakufu to build up defences in Ezo.
 In 1808, the British frigate HMS Phaeton, preying on Dutch shipping in the Pacific, sailed into Nagasaki under a Dutch flag, demanding supplies upon discovering that their prey had already left. The Phaeton sailed away before Japanese authorities arrived from Kyoto.
 In 1811, the Russian naval lieutenant Vasily Golovnin landed on Kunashiri Island, and was arrested by the Bakufu and imprisoned for 2 years.
In 1830, the brig Cyprus, a ship of British convicts (destined for colonies in what would become Australia) who had successfully mutinied against their masters and set sail for Canton, China, arrived on the coast of Shikoku near the town of Mugi in Tokushima Prefecture. The mutineers were desperately low on water, firewood, and supplies, but were attacked and sent away by the Japanese. This was the first time a ship ever visited Japan from what are now Australian waters.
Also in 1830, the Bonin Islands, claimed by Japan but uninhabited, were settled by the American Nathaniel Savory, who landed on the island of Chichijima and formed the first colony there.
 In 1837, an American businessman in Canton named Charles W. King saw an opportunity to open trade by trying to return to Japan three Japanese sailors (among them, Otokichi) who had been shipwrecked a few years before on the coast of Oregon. He went to the Uraga Channel with Morrison, an unarmed American merchant ship. The ship was fired upon several times, and finally sailed back unsuccessfully.
In 1842, following the news of the defeat of China in the Opium War and internal criticism following the Morrison Incident, the  responded favourably to foreign demands for the right to refuel in Japan by suspending the order to execute foreigners and adopting the "Order for the Provision of Firewood and Water" (.
In 1844, a French naval expedition under Captain Fornier-Duplan visited Okinawa on April 28, 1844. Trade was denied, but Father Forcade was left behind with a translator.
In 1845, the whaling ship Manhattan rescued 22 Japanese shipwrecked sailors. Captain Mercator Cooper was allowed into Edo Bay, where he stayed for four days and met with the Governor of Edo and several high officers representing the Emperor. They were given several presents and allowed to leave unmolested, but told never to return.
 On July 20, 1846, Commander James Biddle, sent by the United States Government to open trade, anchored in Tokyo Bay with two ships, including one warship armed with 72 cannons, but his demands for a trade agreement remained unsuccessful.
 On July 24, 1846, the French Admiral Cécille arrived in Nagasaki, but failed in his negotiations and was denied landing. He was accompanied by two priests who had learnt the Japanese language in Okinawa: Father Forcade and Father Ko.
In 1848, Scottish/Chinook Ranald MacDonald pretended to be shipwrecked on the island of Rishiri in order to gain access to Japan. He was sent to Nagasaki, where he stayed for 10 months and became the first English teacher in Japan. Upon his return to America, MacDonald made a written declaration to the United States Congress, explaining that the Japanese society was well policed, and the Japanese people well behaved and of the highest standard.
 In 1848, Captain James Glynn sailed to Nagasaki, leading at last to the first successful negotiation by an American with "Closed Country" Japan. James Glynn recommended to the United States Congress that negotiations to open Japan should be backed up by a demonstration of force, thus paving the way to Perry's expedition.
 In 1849, the Royal Navy's HMS Mariner entered Uraga Harbour to conduct a topographical survey. Onboard was the Japanese castaway Otokichi, who acted as a translator. To avoid problems with the Japanese authorities, he disguised himself as Chinese, and said that he had learned Japanese from his father, allegedly a businessman who had worked in relation with Nagasaki.
 In 1853, the Russian embassy of Yevfimy Putyatin arrived in Nagasaki (August 12, 1853). The embassy demonstrated a steam engine, which led to the first recorded attempts at manufacturing a steam engine in Japan, by Hisashige Tanaka in 1853.

These largely unsuccessful attempts continued until July 8, 1853, when Commodore Matthew Perry of the U.S. Navy with four warships: Mississippi, Plymouth, Saratoga, and Susquehanna steamed into the Bay of Edo (Tokyo) and displayed the threatening power of his ships' Paixhans guns. He demanded that Japan open to trade with the West.

End of isolationism

The following year, at the Convention of Kanagawa (March 31, 1854), Perry returned with eight ships and forced the Shogun to sign the "Treaty of Peace and Amity", establishing formal diplomatic relations between Japan and the United States. The United Kingdom signed the Anglo-Japanese Friendship Treaty at the end of 1854.

Between 1852 and 1855, Admiral Yevfimiy Putyatin of the Russian Navy made several attempts to obtain from the Shogun favourable trade terms for Russia. In June 1853, he brought to Nagasaki Bay a letter from the Foreign Minister Karl Nesselrode and demonstrated to Tanaka Hisashige a steam engine, probably the first ever seen in Japan. His efforts culminated in the signing of the Treaty of Shimoda in February 1855.

Within five years, Japan had signed similar treaties with other western countries. The Harris Treaty was signed with the United States on July 29, 1858. These "Ansei Treaties" were widely regarded by Japanese intellectuals as unequal, having been forced on Japan through gunboat diplomacy, and as a sign of the West's desire to incorporate Japan into the imperialism that had been taking hold of the continent. Among other measures, they gave the Western nations unequivocal control of tariffs on imports and the right of extraterritoriality to all their visiting nationals. They would remain a sticking point in Japan's relations with the West up to the turn of the 20th century.

Missions to the West

In the 1861 Tsushima Incident, a Russian fleet tried to force open a harbour not officially opened to foreign trade with foreign countries, but it was repelled with the help of the British.

An Embassy to Europe was sent in 1862, and a Second Embassy to Europe in 1863. Japan also sent a delegation and participated to the 1867 World Fair in Paris.

Other missions, distinct from those of the Shogunate, were also sent to Europe, such as the Chōshū Five, and missions by the fief of Satsuma.

See also
  – Maritime restrictions;  in Japanese.
 Convention of Kanagawa
 Dutch missions to Edo
 Joseon missions to Japan
 Ryukyuan missions to Edo
 List of Westerners who visited Japan before 1868
 San Felipe incident (1596)
Sakoku Edict of 1635

References

Further reading
 Hall, John Wesley. (1955) Tanuma Okitsugu: Forerunner of Modern Japan. Cambridge: Harvard University Press.
 Oshima, Akihide. (2009) Sakoku to iu Gensetsu.（大島明秀『「鎖国」という言説』）Kyoto in Japan: Minerva Publisher.

External links
 .

Foreign relations of the Tokugawa shogunate
Japanese historical terms
Isolationism
Japanese foreign policy
Political history of Japan
Immigration bans